For Boys Only: The Biggest, Baddest Book Ever is a non-fiction book by Marc Aronson and HP Newquist. The book has 100 short articles on subjects that appeal to boys, such as biting spiders, Easter Island, invisibility cloaks, and fake blood. It also includes a set of 39 codes for the reader to solve, which vary in difficulty.

Reception
A Booklist review stated that “In a tone both light and humorous, Newquist and Aronson aim to please by assembling a tantalizing assortment of codes, puzzles, best lists, brief history and science facts, instructions for fake blood and the ultimate Frisbee, and even advice about facing up to a shark (“try not to bleed too much”) . . . this offers lots of good fun, and with so much chick lit available, it’s nice to see special attention being paid to boys. In fact, there’s nothing here to keep girls away but the title.” 

Publishers Weekly wrote that "this graphically fresh and topically diverse collection should capture the imagination of its target audience."

A New York Times review says, "The overall problem with all this mountainous stuff, thunked helter-skelter into these boy books, whether Roarke’s Drift, Andrewsarchus Mongoliensis (a giant wolf-like animal that may have eaten beached whales), the invention of the juice-box (1980) or strategies for winning at rock-paper-scissors: It all cooks up into a saltless stew that won't offend the palates of kids or chickens".

It was also reviewed in School Library Journal and was an American Library Association "Quick Pick."

The book is part of the New York Public Library's "Books For The Teenage."

References

2007 children's books
Children's non-fiction books
American children's books
Trivia books